Warren Coniam is a Canadian Super Modified racer who was inducted into the Canadian Motorsport Hall of Fame in 1996.

See also
Motorsport in Canada

References

Living people
Canadian racing drivers
Year of birth missing (living people)
Place of birth missing (living people)
20th-century Canadian people